Ba Ili is a sub-prefecture of Loug Chari, Chari-Baguirmi, Chad.

Ba Ili Airport is located nearby.

References

Populated places in Chad